Chitraguptavanshi Kayastha, also referred as North Indian Kayastha, is a subgroup of Hindus of the Kayastha community that are mainly concentrated in the Hindi Belt of North India.

In Hindu texts and traditions, they are described to have descended from the Hindu god Chitragupta who is usually depicted carrying "a flowing notebook, a pen and an inkpot" engaged in writing down human deeds. They are further divided into twelve , each of which is claimed to be the progeny of Chitragupta's two consorts.

The earliest recorded history of these groups goes to the early medieval period of Indian history, while the word "Kayastha" itself dates to the third-century CE. The North Indian Kayasthas were powerful components of the upper-bureaucracy and made highly influential urban elites under Hindu kings. Following Islamic invasions of India, they became some of the first Indian groups to learn Persian regularly and eventually became integrated into an Indo-Muslim governing community gaining hereditary control over the position of Qanungo but rarely converting to Islam.

Under the colonial rule, many Kayastha families became early beneficiaries of the British power and success in the subcontinent. In 1919, Kayasthas accounted for two-thirds of all Indian Government law members across north India, with most of them in the United Provinces.

Etymology 
According to Merriam-Webster, the word Kāyastha is probably formed from the Sanskrit kāya (body), and the suffix -stha (standing, being in). The suffix vanshi is derived from the Sanskrit word vansh (वंश) which translates to belonging to a particular family dynasty.

History

Early North India  

From the eleventh-century onwards, epigraphical texts mention various regional lineages belonging to the North Indian branch of the Kayasthas, which were identified with their common occupational specialization and whose members had become particularly influential in the administration of mediaeval kingdoms. Some Kayasthas even had feudatory status; some had received the title of Pandita for their extensive knowledge, while others, who were financially well-off, commissioned construction of temples. The earliest epigraphic mention of Chitragupta having any connection with the Chitraguptavanshi Kayasthas appears around the same period from a royal charter (dated 1115 CE) written by a Srivastava feudatory of Govindachandra of Kannauj. Similar epigraphic records mention Mathur feudatory of Udayasimha, and members of other Kayastha branches holding important administrative positions under different mediaeval kingdoms.

Soḍḍhala, the author of the eleventh-century Sanskrit work Udayasundarī Kathā, called himself a Vālabhya-Kayastha while also claiming to be a Kshatriya (warrior class). The members of this lineage, possibly from Vallabhi, are mentioned as early as ninth-century in the epigraphs of the Rashtrakuta king Amoghavarsha.

Kayasthas, according to Romila Thapar, had become a "powerful component of the upper-bureaucracy" and were on occasion "highly respected as royal biographers" and composers of inscriptions. Inviting them as professional scribes was considered an indicator of an established kingdom. Thapar also notes that "as recipients of office and holders of grants of land, brahmanas, kayasthas, and sreshtins (wealthy merchants)" were moving into a cultural circle which "attempted to diffuse a Sanskritic culture" 

According to Chitrarekha Gupta, Kayasthas became "king-makers and the most influential urban elites".

Indo-Islamic Era 

The rise of Timuri political power after the sixteenth century had the effect of opening new roles for Kayasthas. The North-Indian Kayasthas were some of the first groups to learn Persian regularly even before it became the court language. Kayasthas were a major demographic block in maktabs (equivalent of primary school) where they acquired skills of copying and writing, which were necessary for working in various Mughal departments. Thus, Kayasthas became conversant with and literate in wider Perso-Arabic fiscal lexicon and started to fulfil requirements of the Mughal administration as qanungos and patwaris. Kayasthas, according to Irfan Habib, were the "second layer" of revenue management in Mughal India, dealing with rudiments of revenue collection, land records, and paper management, where their basic Persian literacy and copying skills were put to use.

By the eighteenth century, Kayasthas' control of the qanungo position had essentially become hereditary.

Some Kayasthas were elevated to high ranking positions, such as Raghunath Ray Kayastha (d. 1664)—the Mughal Empire's "acting wazir" and finance minister, whom Emperor Aurangzeb regarded as the greatest administrator he had ever met, and Chandar Bhan Brahman referred to as the "frontispiece in the book of the men of the pen of Hindustan". Emperor Akbar's finance minister, Raja Todar Mal (born in Sitapur, Uttar Pradesh), is often referred to as a Kayastha. In fact, it was under Akbar's reign and Todar Mal's encouragement that most Kayasthas learnt Persian and were appointed as qanungos in the first place.

As their participation in Indo-Persian cultural forms grew, so did their interactions with Muslims, and the Kayasthas gradually became loosely integrated into an Indo-Muslim governing community. The North Indian Kayasthas, in contrast to CKPs and Bengali Kayasthas, became known for adopting an Indo-Muslim lifestyle, which was reflected in their attire, mannerism, and a common affinity for sharab with Muslim aristocracy. To navigate the Indo-Muslim circle of service and literacy, many adopted Perso-Arabic pennames. 
   

The ulama, Muslim aristocracy, and Persian poets, on the other hand, looked down on Kayasthas for wielding influence, labelling them "disloyal, cruel, cheats, and extortionists". According to Ayesha Jalal, unless it was a full-fledged conversion some Muslims kept Hindus ‘at a figurative and literal arm's length’. One Muslim commentator noted that the Hindu pensman who spoke Persian was a ‘neo-Muslim, but still retained [sic] the smell of kufr [infidelity] and discord in his heart'. The Muslim reformer Shah Waliullah once complained that ‘all [of India's] accountants and clerks [are] Hindus…they control [sic] the country's wealth’. Kayasthas had to try and convince Muslims that they did not represent infidelity in Islam, as ulama claimed. Many Kayasthas left their sacred thread (suta) at home when Emperor Aurangzeb made it illegal to wear it at court.

Most Kayasthas remained pragmatic and vocationally oriented towards their Persian language skills, probably with the exception of Munshi Hargopal Tufta (d. 1879), the chief shagird of Mirza Ghalib. They also remained largely reluctant and rarely converted to Islam which, according to H. Bellenoit, limited their "administrative worth". Those who did convert maintained traditions of accountancy and paper-management, and are known as Muslim Kayasthas, a numerically small community of northern India.

Under Nawabs of Awadh 

The Kayastha's association with the Nawab's began early with Nawal Ray (d. 1750), a Saksena Kayastha from Etawah. In 1748, Safdar Jang made him deputy governor over Allahabad and he was awarded the title of first Raja and then of Maharaja. Nawal died on the battlefield fighting against Pathans on behalf of Safdar 

Under the reign of Asaf-ud-Daula, the Kayastha Raja Tikait Rai who served as a Diwan became an important figure in the region's administration. After him a number of Kayastha administrators such as Raja Jhau Lal, Raja Gulab Rai, Munshi Hardayal, Trilok Chand Bakshi, Raja Jiya Lal and several others made important contributions in administration and cultural activities of Awadh.

In some areas, Kayasthas were more willing to embrace outward signs of a spiritual orientation that was almost Islamic. Many were active members of Sufi shrines and frequently attended in Shia spiritual months of Muharram and Ashura. In 1780s Lucknow, thousands of Kayastha worked as calligraphers who had mastered the Persian works of Hafez and Sadi.

Shiva Dasa 'Lakhnavi', a Kayastha from Awadh, authored his monumental work Shahnama Munawar Kalam in Persian, which provides account of events, political upheavals and factional struggles from the time of Emperor Farrukhsiyar (1712 CE) to Emperor Muhammad Shah's fourth regnal year (1723 CE).

Bhakti movement 
The Kayasthas also became a part of the larger Bhakti movement in northern India.

Dhruvadasa (d. 1643), a Kayastha from Deoband (Uttar Pradesh), whose family served as government servants, is considered one of the Radhavallabh sect's foremost poets. Another Kayastha Ghanananda (d. 1739), who served as the Mughal Emperor Muhammad Shah's Mir Munshi, renounced his worldly life and remained in Vrindavan until he was killed by soldiers of Ahmad Shah Abdali. He is regarded as one of the finest Braj Bhasha poets. The most important contribution came from Lalach Kavi, a Kayastha from Raebareli, who in 1530 CE wrote the first ever Hindi vernacular adaptation of the Sanskrit text Bhagavata Purana's "Dasam Skandha".

British Raj  

By the 1820s, the East India company's agrarian taxation had built upon a network of paper-managers that reached back into the Late Mughal era. The registrars and accountants provided important information on "rents, assessments and methods of negotiating rent rates". In the Great rebellion triggered by the annexation of Awadh in 1856, many old Nawabi fiscal records were destroyed in Lucknow and Faizabad. Kayastha qanungos and scribes proved to be of great help in achieving fiscal consolidation and integration of the region into north Indian administration. And in this sense, Kayasthas became well-known in the colonial officialdom and it was observed that:

The early colonial administration, thus, came to be shaped by influential Kayastha families who became early beneficiaries of the British power and success.  In 1919, at the cusp of Congress's launch of Civil Disobedience, Kayasthas accounted for two-thirds of all Indian Government law members across north India, with most of them in the United Provinces. One famous Gaur Kayastha, Brij Bhukhan Lal, became the first Indian to hold the post of Registrar Judicial in Oudh.

Kayastha Samachar 
Munshi Kali Prasad, who also founded the Kayastha Pathshala, commenced the publication of an Urdu journal - the Kayastha Samachar. It gained recognition among Indian periodicals and was invited to the Delhi Darbar in 1903. Its language was subsequently changed to English whereas name to Hindustan Review and Kayastha Samachar and later Hindustan Review. By 1904, the circulation of the Hindustan Review and Kayastha Samachar was the largest of any Indian monthly.

Controversies 
In the 1880s, Allan Octavian Hume called for the colonial government to:

As part of the British divide and rule strategy, in 1901, the Principal of Queens College received a directive from the Commissioner of Benares and its District Collector that candidates for the Collector's office should "belong to castes other than Kayasthas." Thus, making room for Brahmins and other castes.

Census of India (1931) 
According to census of India of 1931, Chitraguptavanshi Kayasthas were the most literate caste group in United Provinces of Agra and Oudh. Around 70% of Kayastha males aged 7 years and over and 19% females were literate.

Modern India 

Modern scholars categorise them among Indian communities that were traditionally described as "urban-oriented", "upper caste" and part of the "well-educated" pan-Indian elite, alongside Khatris, Kashmiri Pandits, Parsis, Nagar Brahmins of Gujarat, South-Indian Brahmins, Deshastha Brahmins, Chitpavan Brahmin, Prabhu Kayasthas, Bhadralok Bengalis and upper echelons of the Muslim and Christian communities that made up the middle class at the time of Indian independence in 1947.

Varna status
The functionality of the Kayasthas, who identified themselves with "Chitragupta and paper-oriented service", was more significant before the 1870s, and historically, their caste status have been ambiguous. Kayasthas of northern India regard themselves as a de facto varna that arose to keep records of the four varnas that came before them. Traditions and occupations associated with them, and their belief in the mythical roles assigned to Chitragupta, their progenitor, partly support this claim.

Social status 
By 1900, the Kayasthas became so dominant as a 'service caste' that "their ability to mould north India's governance led to numerous calls from British officialdom to cut their numbers down". The late-nineteenth-century ethnographers and observers unanimously agreed on the Kayasthas' high social status in the Hindu society.

They are recognized as a Forward Caste, as they do not qualify for any of the reservation benefits allotted to Scheduled Castes and Scheduled Tribes and Other Backward Classes that are administered by the Government of India.

Society and culture

Chitraguptavanshi Kayasthas are primarily divided into twelve subgroups. These subgroups have traditionally practiced endogamy within their subgroup. H. Bellenoit has shown that these subgroups tended to reside in certain geographic areas of Hindustan.

Subgroups

Writing system 

Kaithi is a historical Brahmic script that was used widely in parts of Northern India especially Awadh and Bihar. The script derives its name from the word "Kayastha". Documents in Kaithi are traceable to at least the 16th century. The script was widely used during the Mughal period.

Under the British Raj, the script was recognized as the official script of the law courts in some provinces. John Nesfield in Oudh, George Campbell in Bihar and a committee in Bengal all advocated for the use of the script in education.

Women 
Traditionally, the North Indian Kayastha women were allowed to attend school and receive education, but were kept in "far more seclusion than the Rajput women," according to a Colonial era census report. Some patriarchs of the caste also seemed to have kept concubines.

A 2015 survey at a District Court revealed that the Kayastha caste appeared to have produced the most female lawyers overall. The Kayastha caste, unlike the majority of other castes in Indian society, typically relies on employment rather than land, hence both men and women in this caste marry after obtaining professional qualifications. The Kayastha women consequently marry at an older-than-average age.

Festivals 
Beside celebrating all major Hindu festivals, Kayasthas also celebrate Chitragupta Puja (also known as Kalam-Dawat Puja) around the festival of Diwali. The rituals symbolize veneration towards the pen, paper, ink-pot and Chitragupta that are considered indispensable part of the Kayastha heritage.

Diet and cuisine 
Kayasth cuisine focuses a great deal on meat –  in fact, most vegetables in the Kayastha menu are prepared the same way as meat. Yet traditionally meat eating is often limited to public sphere as Kayasthas tend to consume vegetarian cuisine at home.

Education and Literacy 
According to the last completed census of India of 1931, Chitraguptavanshi Kayasthas were the most literate caste group in United Provinces of Agra and Oudh. Around 70% of Kayastha males aged 7 years and over and 19% females were literate.

Notables

Politicians and revolutionaries 
 Yashwant Sinha
 Krishna Ballabh Sahay
Mahamaya Prasad Sinha
Sachchidananda Sinha
Subodh Kant Sahay
 Jayaprakash Narayan
 Rajendra Prasad
 Shyam Nandan Sahay
 Shailendra Nath Shrivastava
Lal Bahadur Shastri
Shiv Charan Mathur
Ravi Shankar Prasad
Nitin Nabin
Jayant Sinha
Har Dayal
Pandey Ganpat Rai

Literature 

 Premchand
 Harivansh Rai Bachchan
 Firaq Gorakhpuri
 Mahadevi Varma
 Bhagwati Charan Verma
 Dharamvir Bharati
 Ramkumar Verma
 Nirad C. Chaudhuri
 Saumitra Saxena

Science and Technology 

 Shanti Swaroop Bhatnagar
 Vinod Dham
Harish Chandra Verma

Actors and Artists 

 Mukesh (singer)
 Sonu Nigam
 Siddharth Nigam
 Shatrughan Sinha
 Raju Srivastav
 Sonali Khare
 Amitabh Bachchan
Mini Mathur

See also 
 Chandraseniya Kayastha Prabhu
 Karan Kayastha
Bengali Kayastha

References

Bibliography 

 
 

Social groups of Uttar Pradesh
Social groups of Bihar
Kayastha